Count Michael Mikhailovich de Torby (8 October 1898 in Wiesbaden – 25 April 1959 in London) was the son of Grand Duke Michael Mikhailovich of Russia (1861–1929) and his morganatic wife Countess Sophie of Merenberg (1868–1927). The great-grandson of Emperor Nicholas I of Russia and Alexander Pushkin.

Biography
Count Mikhail Mikhailovich de Torby was the youngest child and only son of Grand Duke Mikhail Mikhailovich and his morganatic wife Countess Sophie von Merenberg. The marriage was not only morganatic but also illegal under the Imperial house laws and caused a scandal at the Russian court. The Grand Duke was forbidden to return to Russia for life so he moved to England.

Mikhail was educated at Eton College. A gifted artist, his work is distinguished by "pleasant colours and free style." He had a special fondness for Chinese subjects and their works created mainly on rice paper in a thin Chinese-style. He was a collector of Chinese porcelain, which he often portrayed in his still lifes. He also served as a theatre artist.

He took British citizenship in 1938, when he was forty years old.

He died 25 April 1959 and did not leave offspring.

Ancestry

Links
"Chinese poet's dream" "Chinese poet's dream"

1898 births
1959 deaths
People educated at Eton College
Morganatic issue of Romanovs
Counts of the Russian Empire
Emigrants from the Russian Empire to the United Kingdom
Russian painters
British painters
Russian collectors
British collectors